Vanishing Africa is the title of the 1982 English-language translation of German film director Leni Riefenstahl's Mein Afrika, a photographic book published in the same year in Germany. It was published by Harmony Books in the United States.

Synopsis
The pictures are evidence of Riefenstahl's work as a photographer in Africa. According to the book, Riefenstahl wanted to capture the African traditional way of life before it lost its "innocence" to the modern age.

References

1982 books
German books
Books by Leni Riefenstahl
Photography in Africa
Harmony Books books